As the Veneer of Democracy Starts to Fade is the second album by British singer Mark Stewart, released in 1985 through Mute Records.

Accolades

Track listing

Personnel 
Mark Stewart and the Maffia
Mark Stewart – vocals, production
Keith LeBlanc – drums
Skip McDonald – guitar
Adrian Sherwood – keyboards, production
Doug Wimbish – bass
Additional musicians and production
Jill Mumford – design
Tim Young – mastering

Chart positions

References

External links 
 

1985 albums
Albums produced by Adrian Sherwood
Mute Records albums
Mark Stewart (English musician) albums